Baron Newborough is a title that has been created twice in the Peerage of Ireland. Both titles are extant. The first creation came in 1716 in favour of George Cholmondeley, later 2nd Earl of Cholmondeley. See Marquess of Cholmondeley for further history of this creation. The second creation came in 1776 in favour of Sir Thomas Wynn, 3rd Baronet. He represented Caernarvonshire, St Ives and Beaumaris in the House of Commons and also served as Lord Lieutenant of Caernarvonshire. His son, the second Baron, represented Caernarvonshire in Parliament. He died unmarried and was succeeded by his younger brother, the third Baron. He served as High Sheriff of Anglesey in 1847. On his death the titles passed to his grandson, the fourth Baron (the son of the Hon. Thomas John Wynn). He died as a result of an illness contracted on active service during the First World War and was succeeded by his younger brother, the fifth Baron. When he died in 1957 the titles were inherited by his first cousin, the sixth Baron. He was the son of the Hon. Charles Henry Wynn, third son of the third Baron. He was succeeded in 1965 by his eldest son as the seventh Baron.  the titles are held by the seventh Baron's son, the eighth Baron, who succeeded his father in 1998.

The Wynn Baronetcy, of Bodvean in the County of Caernarfon, was created in the Baronetage of Great Britain on 25 October 1742 for the first Baron's grandfather Thomas Wynn. He represented Caernarfon in the House of Commons and was also a court official. His son, the second Baronet, represented both Caernarfon and Caernarvonshire in Parliament. He was succeeded by his son, the third Baronet, who was elevated to the peerage in 1776.

The family seat is no longer Peplow Hall, near Hodnet, Shropshire. The family also own the Rhug Estate near Corwen, Denbighshire (the new family seat) and once owned Glynllifon (Plas Glynlifon), near Llandwrog, Gwynedd, Wales.

Wynn Baronets, of Bodvean (1742)
Sir Thomas Wynn, 1st Baronet (1677–1749)
Sir John Wynn, 2nd Baronet (1701–1773)
Sir Thomas Wynn, 3rd Baronet (1736–1807) (created Baron Newborough in 1776)

Barons Newborough (1776)

Thomas Wynn, 1st Baron Newborough (1736–1807)
Thomas John Wynn, 2nd Baron Newborough (1802–1832)
Spencer Bulkeley Wynn, 3rd Baron Newborough (1803–1888)
William Charles Wynn, 4th Baron Newborough (1873–1916)
Thomas John Wynn, 5th Baron Newborough (1878–1957)
Robert Vaughan Wynn, 6th Baron Newborough (1877–1965)
Robert Charles Michael Vaughan Wynn, 7th Baron Newborough (1917–1998)
Robert Vaughan Wynn, 8th Baron Newborough (b. 1949)

The heir presumptive is the present holder's first cousin Anthony Charles Vaughan Wynn (b. 1949)
The heir presumptive's heir presumptive is his brother Andrew Guy Wynn (b. 1950)
The heir presumptive's heir presumptive's heir apparent is his son Alexander Charles Guy Wynn (b. 1981)

Notes

References

External links
Newborough Archives 

Baronies in the Peerage of Ireland
1742 establishments in Ireland
Noble titles created in 1716
Noble titles created in 1776